Incredibuild is a suite of grid computing software developed by Incredibuild Ltd. Incredibuild's mission is to help accelerate computationally-intensive tasks by distributing them over the network, with notable applications including compiling source code, building software generally, and other software developmentrelated tasks. Jobs can be distributed to several computers over a network, giving both the possibility of accelerating the work by using more resources than were available on the initiating computer alone and potentially freeing local resources for other tasks.

Incredibuild tools are available for Microsoft Windows and Linux, and have support for accelerating builds targeting those platforms. Other platforms include but are not limited to Android, Nintendo Switch, PlayStation 4, Xbox One, and other platforms. Originally sold specifically as a tool to accelerate compiling, IncrediBuild can now be used for other development processes as well as general high performance computing.

History 
Incredibuild is a grid computing software start-up based in Tel Aviv, Israel. Founded in 2002, the company is led by CEO Tami Mazel Shachar.

In 2002, they introduced Incredibuild v1.0, offering a solution for acceleration of Microsoft Visual Studio 6.0 C/C++ code builds. Incredibuild 1.3 was awarded with Game Developer Magazine's annual Front Line Award in The Category of Programing for the year of 2003.

After adding support to Visual Studio NET and Visual Studio 2005, Incredibuild later expanded Incredibuild with what was at the time called "XGE Interfaces". This package allowed customers to implement custom acceleration of jobs that were not necessarily compilation-related, by exposing a set of interfaces to Incredibuild's core grid engine technology.

In 2008, Incredibuild won a "Productivity Award" in the Change and Configuration Management Category Of The 18th annual Jolt Awards.

Tools 
Incredibuild's software suite is broken up into several, separately-licensable tools. Incredibuild for Visual Studio C/C++ provides Visual Studio integration to accelerate the builds of C and C++ projects. Incredibuild for Make and Other Build Tools provides integration with several standard build tools including make, CMake, and MSBuild. Incredibuild for Dev Tools provides additional interfaces for distributing jobs, which need not necessarily be building or compiling-related.

Notable users 
Incredibuild is used by several software development companies, including a number of video game developers. In 2021, the gaming sector made up 60% of Incredibuild's business. Turn 10 Studios, for instance, used Incredibuild to accelerate builds, rendering from 3DS Max, code analysis, and other tasks during the development of Forza 5. Incredibuild also claims Epic Games, Electronic Arts, id Software, Bohemia Interactive, Scaleform Corporation, FromSoftware, and Bugbear Entertainment as clients. CryEngine and Unreal Engine include built-in support for build acceleration via Incredibuild.

See also 
 Distcc
 Electric Cloud

References

External links

Incredibuild review

Compiling tools
Grid computing
Programming tools for Windows